Qurbantəpə is a village in the Jabrayil Rayon of Azerbaijan.
 It was occupied by the Armenian forces in 1993. The Army of Azerbaijan recaptured the village on or around October 30, 2020.

References

Populated places in Jabrayil District